Óscar Asiáin (21 February 1949 – 8 March 2017) was a Mexican basketball player. He competed in the men's tournament at the 1968 Summer Olympics.

Asiáin was born in Chihuahua, Mexico, in February 1949, and graduated from the Autonomous University of Chihuahua. As well as competing at the Olympics, he also competed at the 1967 Pan American Games and the 1975 Pan American Games.

Asiáin was a director of the Chihuahuan Institute of Sport, and he was inducted into the Chihuahuan Sports Hall of Fame in 2000.

He died in March 2017 from cancer, at the age of 68.

References

External links
 

1949 births
2017 deaths
Mexican men's basketball players
1974 FIBA World Championship players
Olympic basketball players of Mexico
Basketball players at the 1968 Summer Olympics
People from Chihuahua City
Basketball players from Chihuahua